Wen Chean Lim (born 30 July 1988) is a Malaysian rhythmic gymnast.

She competed at the 2006 Commonwealth Games where she won a silver medal in the team event and bronze medals in the ball and ribbon events.

References

1988 births
Living people
Malaysian rhythmic gymnasts
Commonwealth Games medallists in gymnastics
Commonwealth Games silver medallists for Malaysia
Commonwealth Games bronze medallists for Malaysia
Gymnasts at the 2006 Commonwealth Games
Medallists at the 2006 Commonwealth Games